Shah ibn Mikal or al-Shah ibn Mikal, was an Iranian nobleman from the Mikalid family, who served as a military commander of the Tahirid dynasty and Abbasid Caliphate.

Biography 
He was the son of Mikal, a nobleman who had left Iraq and settled in Khurasan, and could trace his descent back to the Sogdian ruler Divashtich. Shah also had a brother named Muhammad ibn Mikal, who, during his early career, along with Shah, played an important role under the Tahirid ruler Abdallah ibn Tahir al-Khurasani. In 864/865, Muhammad was killed during a battle at Ray. During the Caliphal Civil War of 865–866 between the two Abbasids al-Musta'in and al-Mu'tazz, Shah, along with the majority of the Iranians and Arabs sided with al-Musta'in, while the majority of the Turkic military officers sided with al-Mu'tazz. On March 20 865, Shah, along with the two other military officers Bundar al-Tabari and Khalid ibn 'Imran, fought the Turks near Baghdad, but were defeated and forced to withdraw. In the end, the civil war resulted in a victory for al-Mu'tazz. Shah, along with many other supporters of al-Musta'in, however, managed to successfully change their allegiance to al-Mu'tazz.

In 870, Shah was sent under an army to suppress the revolt of the Alid Ali ibn Zayd al-Talibi, which he managed to accomplish. During the Zanj Rebellion, Shah was in 880 appointed as one of the commanders of the cavalry. Nothing more is known about Shah; he later died in the late 9th-century.

Family 
Shah had a son named Muhammad ibn Shah, who was in 892 appointed by the Abbasid caliph Al-Mu'tadid as the commander of his guards. Shah also had a nephew named Abd-Allah Mikali, who was the son of his brother Muhammad.

References

Sources 
 
 
 
 

9th-century Iranian people
9th-century deaths
Generals of the Abbasid Caliphate
9th-century births
Mikalids